Hawaii Route 31, also known as the Pi'ilani Highway, is a 38-mile road on the island of Maui in Maui County, Hawaii, United States.

Description
The route begins in at an intersection with Hawaii Routes 310 and 311 in the East Maui town of Kihei. The highway formerly ran parallel to the coast all the way to the southern terminus of the Hana Highway (Route 360), until developments in Wailea and Makena blocked access. The Kihei section of the highway now terminates in Wailea, and the much longer Kaupo section, which is mostly a one-lane, winding road, is county-maintained as County Road 31, connects Route 37 near Kula to the Route 360 south of Hana (at the western border of Haleakala National Park).

Major intersections

See also

 List of state highways in Hawaii
 List of highways numbered 31

References

External links

Transportation in Maui County, Hawaii
0031